Erotic talk, also known as dirty talk, gross talk, love talk, naughty talk, sexting, sexy talk, talking dirty, or talking gross is the practice of using explicit word imagery to heighten sexual excitement before and during (or instead of) physical sexual activity. It is commonly a part of foreplay, and can include vivid erotic descriptions, sexual humor, sexual commands and rude words. It may be whispered into a partner's ear, spoken over a telephone, or put into text. The intention of erotic talk is generally to generate excitement between one, both or all parties engaged in a sexual interaction, or even to induce orgasm.

When lovers are apart from one another and physical intimacy is impossible, it can be an important aspect of virtual sex, particularly phone sex and cybersex. Additionally, love talk is more sexual in nature than pillow talk and tends to occur preceding or during rather than following lovemaking.

The Marquis de Sade, who fancied himself an expert on matters sexual, states in the introduction to The 120 Days of Sodom that "among libertines, it is commonly accepted that the most voluptuous sensations are transmitted by the organs of hearing"—that is, that dirty talk is the most arousing form of sex. One fictional character in porn films that became associated with the idea of men using naughty talk with women was actor John Leslie's character of 'Jack' in Talk Dirty to Me (1980).

An Examination of the Nature of Erotic Talk 
In their publication An Examination of the Nature of Erotic Talk, Peter K. Jonason, Gabrielle L. Betteridge, and Ian I. Kneebone conduct a deep study of erotic talk, and how humans use it. In this publication, the authors report the results of their study. In a large-scale sexual survey done by the Great Australian Sex Census, it was found that 62% of the survey respondents enjoyed verbal communication during intercourse. Erotic talk can also be an important aspect of relationship-building and relationship satisfaction as well as sexual satisfaction. Erotic talk can also help to facilitate orgasm for both men and women. Interestingly enough, this trend was also seen in non-human primates. This trend also suggest that what is said during intercourse can have biological implications. The authors justify this exploration into erotic talk due to the themes of an individual's sex differences, sociosexuality, and relationship satisfaction.

Eight themes of erotic talk 
The study done by Jonason, Betteridge and Kneebone also uncovered eight message themes of erotic talk. These themes include:

 Sexual dominance
 Sexual submission
 Instructive statements
 Positive feedback/reinforcement
 Intimacy/emotional bonding
 Sexual ownership
 Speaking fantasies
 Reflexive calls

Sexual dominance is rooted in the desire of power in the situation. Sexual submission is rooted in wanting one's partner to be in power in the situation. Instructive statements are generally intended to improve the experience for one or both partners, facilitating communication on what each partner is desiring. Positive feedback/reinforcement is generally intended to encourage desirable sexual behaviors and to encourage a sexual partner. Intimacy/emotional bonding is generally intended to establish a more serious emotional or spiritual connection between two or more partners. Intimacy/emotional bonding is typically most common in serious relationships. Sexual ownership, similarly to sexual dominance is rooted in the desire of power in the situation. These two themes are often very similar and can be concurrent. Speaking fantasies is generally intended to foster imaginative thoughts and to make the encounter more exciting for one or both partners. Reflexive calls are generally intended to be encouraging and to let a partner know that one is enjoying the encounter. Reflexive calls can be involuntary and reactive, as opposed to thought out and intentional.

These eight message themes fit into two higher order factors. These factors are individualist talk and mutualistic talk. Individual talk is a higher order of erotic talk themes that correlate more so to individual satisfaction, while mutualistic talk correlates more so to mutual satisfaction, namely a sexual partner's satisfaction.

Sex differences and similarities in erotic talk 
Although there were several differences between sexes reported, the role of a participant's sex in their survey responses was statistically significant in one theme. That one theme was intimacy/emotional bonding. Jonason, Betteridge, and Kneebone found that women reported more enjoyment and use of examples of erotic talk which fit this specific theme, than men did. This suggests that the fundamental purposes and nature of sex may differ for men and women. While women reacted positively to intimate examples of erotic talk, men reported high levels of excitement for submissive examples of erotic talk.

Although men and women tend to differ slightly in erotic talk preferences, overall, there are some similarities in the data for both. Both men and women reported high levels of enjoyment for mutualistic talk (higher than individualistic talk).

Between the sheets: Investigating young adults' communication during sexual activity 
In their publication Between the sheets: Investigating young adults' communication during sexual activity, Amanda Denes, John P. Crowley and Margaret Bennett conduct a study of erotic talk and its link to sexual and relational outcomes. A study of 319 young adults (237 women and 82 men) between the ages of 18 and 32 years old with a mean of 19 years old was conducted within 2 hours of a recent sexual experience. The goal of this study was to examine their communication during a sexual encounter. The authors then discuss the implications of these findings on sexual satisfaction, post sex disclosure model and relational health in their publication.

The results of this study suggest that positive relational disclosures were more likely to predict the likelihood of orgasm when compared to erotic talk. Furthermore, the individuals who reported engaging in mutualistic erotic talk specifically including the theme of intimacy and bonding also reported higher relationship satisfaction following sexual activity.

Let's Talk Sex: The Science of Your Brain on Dirty Talk 
In her article Let's Talk Sex: The Science of Your Brain on Dirty Talk for Big Think, Molly Hanson states "By electrifying our most powerful sex organs, our brains, research has shown that provacative conversation has the ability to add serious sizzle to our sex lives". She goes on to cite a study conducted by Superdrug Online Doctor looking into the sex talk preferences Americans and Europeans ranging in age from 18-83. The study included 990 participants who had all talked sexually with a partner. Although 90% of participants reported feeling arousal from the right kind of erotic talk, one in five participants admitted to having ceased a sexual encounter due to erotic talk. It was also reported that nearly seven in ten respondents had engaged in erotic talk with their partner(s) in the year previous, but only 29% reported talking sexually during every time they had engaged in intercourse. The respondents who reported being sexually satisfied were also the respondents who reported talking sexually during intercourse, as well as those who engaged in erotic talk outside the bedroom (for example in text messages/sexting). Respondents also reported higher levels of arousal for hearing erotic talk as opposed to speaking erotic talk themselves, and 38% of the respondents in the study reported having a conversation with their partners about erotic talk.

The human brain during erotic talk 
Hanson goes on to discuss the brain's activity during erotic talk. She makes the claim that erotic talk is effective because of a few specific areas in the brain that are sexually responsive. Hanson dubs them the "erogenous zones". These zones are the hypothalamus and the amygdala.

The hypothalamus 
The hypothalamus has two regions in which sex drive and testosterone production are originated: the preoptic area and the suprachiasmatic nucleus. Erotic talk stimulates both of these areas of the hypothalamus, increasing sex drive and testosterone production. Neurophychology expert Daryl Cioffi told Medical Daily in 2015 "People very much enjoy dirty talking because it activates all regions of your brain while your body is also getting stimulated . . . Similar areas of the brain are touched upon during dirty talk as when we curse. So, very often as your brain sees it, the dirtier the better." (Cioffi).

The amygdala 
The Amygdala is the part of the brain that is associated with fear. It also plays a large role in excitement and pleasure during sex. Erotic talk that is specifically within the theme of sexual submission can stimulate the amygdala by increasing feelings of vulnerability.

The brain's hearing center 
The brain's hearing center consists of the temporal lobe, the frontal lobe, and the occipital lobe. The sounds of erotic talk, as all sounds, are processed in this hearing center, and activate other parts of the brain after being processed.

See also
Non-penetrative sex
Obscene phone call
Phone sex
Ribaldry

References

External links
 How to talk dirty at About:sexuality
 Sexual communication at BBC Health

Sexual acts